Frederick I, nicknamed Barbarossa, was one of the most notable Holy Roman Emperors, who left a considerable political and cultural legacy, especially in Germany and Italy. Thus, he has been the subjects of many studies as well as works of art. Due to his popularity and notoriety, in the 19th and early 20th centuries, he was instrumentalized as a political symbol by many movements and regimes: the Risorgimento, the Wilhelmine government in Germany (especially under Emperor Wilhelm I), and the National Socialist movement. Today, when a tradition-establishing form of commemoration for the emperor is no longer necessary, scholars like Kurt Görich call for neutrality and warn against the instrumentalization of the historical person in the other way. Modern historians generally reject nationalist myths, while portraying the emperor as an influential ruler who suffered many setbacks but often managed to recover. Different studies explore different aspects of his personality, with recent German scholarship emphasizing the emperor's relationship with the chivalrous-courtly culture of the time.

Legends and anecdotes

After the 1162 conquest of the city of Milan in 1162, the remains of the Three Kings were sent to Cologne. Today, the Cologne Cathedral houses them and they are still venerated.
As the popular emperor died without confessing (in the Medieval time, a sudden death was considered a punishment from God), various myths were born to help the people cope with this situation. Some chroniclers thus changed the story so that the emperor could repent before dying.
The most famous Barbarossa legend is the Kyffhäuser legend. The legend says he is not dead, but asleep with his knights in a cave in the Kyffhäuser mountains in Thuringia or Mount Untersberg at the border between Bavaria, Germany, and Salzburg, Austria, and that when the ravens cease to fly around the mountain he will awake and restore Germany to a Golden Age. According to the story, his red beard has grown through the table at which he sits. His eyes are half closed in sleep, but now and then he raises his hand and sends a boy out to see if the ravens have stopped flying. A similar story, set in Sicily, was earlier attested about his grandson, Frederick II. To garner political support the German Empire built atop the Kyffhäuser the Kyffhäuser Monument, which declared Kaiser Wilhelm I the reincarnation of Frederick; the 1896 dedication occurred on 18 June, the day of Frederick's coronation. According to Freed, the Prussians were not particularly passionate about the Barbarossa mania in the beginning though (Barbarossa had mainly been a symbol for the Southern princes, who wanted to send a message that they wanted to participate in the affairs of the central government as in the time of the emperor). They only started promoting the legend actively in 1871 (the year Wilhelm I became German emperor).

In medieval Europe, the Golden Legend became refined by Jacobus de Voragine. This was a popularized interpretation of the Biblical end of the world. It consisted of three things: (1) terrible natural disasters; (2) the arrival of the Antichrist; (3) the establishment of a good king to combat the Antichrist. These millennial fables were common and freely traded by the populations on Continental Europe. End-time accounts had been around for thousands of years, but entered the Christian tradition with the writings of the Apostle Peter.

The legend has been read as prophecy from the beginning, as seen in the Italian collection Sibyla Eritrea, the Sächsische Weltchronik (1260), Salimbene di Adam's Cronica (1280). Barbarossa appears in a Messianic form, not just a new but also the final type of ruler – emperor of peace, who is associated with the latter days. 
In later centuries,  German propaganda played into the exaggerated fables believed by the common people by characterizing Frederick Barbarossa and Frederick II as personification of the "good king". Other figures like Martin Luther, Frederick II the Great of Prussia and Bismarck also became associated with the cult of the national leader, which would later be mobilized by national socialists.

Another legend states that when Barbarossa was in the process of seizing Milan in 1158, his wife, the Empress Beatrice, was taken captive by the enraged Milanese and forced to ride through the city on a donkey in a humiliating manner. Some sources of this legend indicate that Barbarossa implemented his revenge for this insult by forcing the magistrates of the city to remove a fig from the anus of a donkey using only their teeth. Another source states that Barbarossa took his wrath upon every able-bodied man in the city, and that it was not a fig they were forced to hold in their mouth, but excrement from the donkey. To add to this debasement, they were made to announce, "Ecco la fica" (meaning "behold the fig"), with the feces still in their mouths. It used to be said that the insulting gesture (called fico), of holding one's fist with the thumb in between the middle and forefinger came by its origin from this event. This legend is mentioned in Gargantua and Pantagruel (sixteenth century).

During the Risorgimento in Italy, Frederick became the symbolic barbarian, foreign oppressor who were defeated by heroes of a national independence movement respresented by the Lombard League. This interpretation later had influence on Italian historiography. Various stories arose – an example is the one by Cesare Cantù, who recounted that Frederick sent back Milanese people whose hands he had cut off or without their eyes. According to Cardini, until this day, some schoolbooks in Italy still describe Frederick Barbarossa as a National Socialist avant-la-lettre.

In Italy, unlike in Germany, Barbarossa as a legendary character remains ambivalent. There are different, even contrasting accounts of his deeds. He inspires strong emotions. While in Milan, Tortona and Asti, the cities that were destroyed by Frederick Barbarossa, still see him as the foreign oppressor, he is seen in favorable light in Como, Pavia and Lodi (it was Lodi's complaint to Barbarossa about Milan's bullying that brought him to Italy) – the latter group sees him as "an ancient supporter of their own cities' traditions". In Brienno, he even has a holy image. For Spoleto, dark and light legends are mixed to produce a "beloved enemy" (amato nemico).

Historiography
[[File:Barbarossa und seine Söhne.jpg|thumb|left|300px|Barbarossa and his sons Henry and Philip, 'Liber ad honorem Augusti des Petrus von Eboli, Burgerbibliothek Bern, Codex 120 II, fol. 143r.]]
In 2010, Professor Gianluca Raccagni of the University of Edinburgh summarized the current knowledge on Frederick's rule as the following:
There are good reasons for Frederick’s enduring legacy and fame through the centuries, since he was deeply involved in expanding the influence of the Holy Roman Empire, enjoyed a long and remarkably stable rule in Germany (relatively speaking), was engaged in a momentous struggle with the papacy and the Lombard city communes, and had extensive contacts with the other Christian rulers in Europe and the Mediterranean, not to mention the crusade that he undertook and during which he died. Frederick came very close to killing the autonomy of the Italian city-states shortly after their birth,
to re-establishing imperial control over the papacy, and to expanding his hegemony in the Mediterranean as well. A recent series of conferences has also underlined the profound influence of his reign on the development of public law.

Otto of Freising, Frederick's uncle, wrote an account of his reign entitled Gesta Friderici I imperatoris (Deeds of the Emperor Frederick). Otto's other major work, the Chronica sive Historia de duabus civitatibus (Chronicle or History of the Two Cities) had been an exposition of the Civitas Dei (The City of God) of St. Augustine of Hippo, full of Augustinian negativity concerning the nature of the world and history. His work on Frederick is of opposite tone, being an optimistic portrayal of the glorious potentials of imperial authority. Otto died after finishing the first two books, leaving the last two to Rahewin, his provost. Rahewin's text is in places heavily dependent on classical precedent.

According to John Freed, until the end of the nineteenth century, even scholars in Germany had to rely on a semi-popular history to get a general overview of Frederick's reign. There were two occasions a substantial effort was made to create a comprehensive biography for the emperor and both ended with the main author's death. The first was the work of Henry Simonsfeld, who died in 1913 and his book, never completed, ends with Otto of Freising's death in 1158. The other notable contribution is the two volumes about Frederick in Wilhelm von Giesebrecht’s Geschichte der Deutschen Kaiserzeit (1855—88). Giesebrecht died in 1889 and thus his student Bernhard von Simson was the one who completed the work in 1895. This later became the scholarly standard work on the emperor's life. 
Giesebrecht presents Barbarossa's era as a high point of German history. Freed opines that this work was meant to arouse patriotism.

In 1975, Frederick's charters were published. This and the postwar abandonment of the Kyffhäuser myth have led to the publications of several new biographies. The notable recent authorities among German-speaking historians include Ferdinand Opll, Johannes Laudage (who died in an accident in 2008 so could not write the section on the 1170s). and Knut Görich.

Bernd Schütte credits Ferdinand Oppl with raising the research of Frederick I to a new and resilient level, with contributions both through studies and bibliographical additions (Oppl is both a researcher and an archiver). Opll's Friedrich Barbarossa presents the emperor as a pragmatic leader with a capacity of adaptation and recovery after defeat. Jean-Yves Mariotte highly praises the works but adds that more clarity on the subjects of the imperial function or the financial aspect of the monarchy might widen the perspective.

Knut Görich's works on Frederick include Friedrich Barbarossa: Eine Biographie and Die Ehre Friedrich Barbarossas: Kommunikation, Konflikt und politisches Handeln im 12. Jahrhundert, in which he extensively discusses Frederick's attachment to the concept of honor imperii, which was tied to not only his self-understanding as a ruler, but also rights and duties, and also subject to balancing acts with what was politically possible. Görich does not see the 1177 Peace of Venice as a defeat for Frederick but a return to consensus, which later helped make room for maneuvre. Graham Loud agrees with Görich that the concept and language of honour permeated Frederick's reign but sometimes, they might have masked complex realities. Loud also notes Görich credibly shows Frederick as a man of ambition, calculation and skills – one of those was "an ability to satisfy and to recompense those who were not necessarily within his inner circle". On the other hand, Loud opines that Görich mentions Frederick's rule north of the Alps too little. Contrary to Laudage, Görich questions whether traditional researchers have overemphasized the intentional side of Frederick's politics and instead highlights his capability of moderating consensus politics and the will to trial new modes of rulership.

Laudage also sees the concept of honour as the central determinant behind Frederick's thinking and actions. According to Laudage, it was because the emperor lived in an environment in which many issues raised in diets and councils were ultimate conflicts of honours (Ehrkonflikte): "In a society that lacked a written imperial constitution, it was crucial to constantly and demonstratively assert one's own reputation and position in the social hierarchy."(p. 46) During his career, Frederick had demonstrated genuine chivalry and generosity, as well as great ambition, but also violence and ruthlessness. Laudage especially criticized the pure force approach Frederick employed against Milan, which ultimately doomed the enterprise. Bernd Schütte notes that Laudage "ascribes to the emperor and his advisors the decisive initiative in all fields, always future-oritented and accompanied by far-reaching ideas and plans." Schütte also opines that in comparison with Ferdinand Opll's work, published in 1990, the chivalrous-courtly aspect of Frederick is now presented in a more pronounced and clear way, as shown in Laudage's work as well as those by other recent scholars.

 
In Italy, the scholarly attention towards Frederick's person and his reign has always been considerable, in light of his extensive activities in the Italian domains. In 1985, Franco Cardini wrote a sympathetic biography. Research often focuses on the relationship, or struggle, between Frederick and Italian municipalities. Today, the "oppressor and oppressed" mythical tradition, fostered by the Risorgimento, is not popular anymore. Researchers saw the conflict as the clash between opposite policial conceptions, for which the two sides tried to find solutions through legal measures as well as by force. Schumann notes that the work Federico Barbarossa nel dibattito storiografico in Italia e in Germania, edited by Manselli and Riedmann, is a definite synthesis of non-nationally oriented historiography approaches (combining German and Italian research results) of the last forty years.

Historians Plassmann and Foerster, in review of Freed's Frederick Barbarossa: the Prince and the Myth, note that the work, as "the first English-language biography of Frederick Barbarossa in several decades", is a valuable source and might serve English-speaking audience well, although there are some problems as well as views particular to the author. Other biographers also discuss the periods during the emperor was powerless, but they do not see it as pervasive throughout his reign as Freed. Plassmann notes that Freed ignores Knut Görich's point that argues that, "Frederick was universally accepted 'as king and emperor and managed to push for the succession he wanted'". According to Plassmann, Frederick achieved an "unusual level of acceptance" within Germany, which helped him to survive excommunication, pestilence, a crushing defeat against the Italian opposition and the defiance of one of the mightiest princes of the realm and ended up as the unquestioned leader of the German host on the third crusade".
Depictions in arts
Poems

An unidentified poet, likely a citizen of the pro-imperial city of Bergamo, wrote The Song of the Deeds of Emperor Frederick in Lombardy. The text ends with the defeat of Frederick at the Battle of Carcano on 9 August 1160.

The Archpoet, a famous contemporary, writes poems about the emperor.
In the panegyric chronicle De Rebus Sicilis (1196) of Peter of Eboli, dedicated to Henry VI, Holy Roman Emperor (reigned 1190–97), Frederick's death is described in the following verses: 
           Already he sees the goal of his wishes [the Holy Land]
           There he migrates in joy to Christ.
The accompanying illustration depicts an angel presenting the emperor's soul, as a baby, to the hand of God. At the same time, the physical body of Frederick is shown plunging into the water. The imperial crown already lies beneath water. John Freed writes that, "This jarring depiction and its ambivalent assessment of Frederick’s reign were soon covered up with a layer of paint that was not removed until the beginning of the twentieth century. The time is long overdue to uncover the prince beneath the myth."
Christian Joseph Matzerath(1815—1876) wrote Kaiser Rotbarts Grab (Emperor Redbeard's grave).

Music

German minnesang tradition began under the reign of Frederick and was inspired by his Crusade as well as his considerable art patronage (and also, the French troubadour tradition of the time), although they were not exhortative or political songs and tended to be love songs instead. Minnesingers such as Friedrich von Hausen depicted Frederick and his court in their works.Der alte Barbarossa, published in 1813 by the poet Friedrich Rückert (1788—1866), is a famous poem about the emperor who sleeps in the mountain, likely influenced by anti-Napoleon sentiments. Music is by Joseph Gersbach. 
Gustav Pressel (1827–1890) composed the notable ballad Barbarossa about the emperor. 
In 1888–1889,  Siegmund von Hausegger composed a large work, the symphonic poem Barbarossa, also inspired by the Kyffhäuser legend and containing three movements.

Theatrical worksLa battaglia di Legnano: The opera by Giuseppe Verdi (music) and Salvadore Cammarano (libretto) was about the 1176 defeat of Frederick by the army of the Lombard League.
Ernst Raupach (1784 – 1852) wrote four plays about Fredrick, one of his sixteen plays about the Hohenstaufens.
Christian Dietrich Grabbe wrote the tragedy Kaiser Friedrich Barbarossa as part of his Hohenstaufen cycle in 1829.Der Untersberg (The Untersberg) is a Singspiel with three acts by Johann Nepomuk Poissl with libretto by Eduard von Schenk, first performed on October 30, 1829 in Munich. The setting of this work is the mountain near Salzburg inside which the emperor is supposedly asleep. Friedrich der Rothbart in Suza oder vassalentreue is a 1841 liederspiel about Frederick, written by Johanna Kinkel with libretto by Gottfried Kinkel.
Frederick is a main character Gervinus, der Narr vom Untersberg oder Ein patriotischer Wunsch is a 1849 opera by Franz von Suppé (the title character Gervinus is his court fool).Federico Barbarossa a Redona, ed Ezzelino terzo, drammi. [In verse.] is a 1851 drama (written in verses) by Cesare Campori.
Richard Wagner connected the two heroes Siegfried and Barbarossa, considering the latter as the second coming of the former. Originally he intended to write an opera about the emperor, mixing Germanic and medieval elements, but in 1848 he decided to write about Siegfried instead.

Visual arts

As the Wittelsbach Dynasty's rise was closely linked to the emperor, in 1166, they integrated an eagle, that represents both the Empire and the Count Palatine of Bavaria, into their coat-of-arms. In 1180, Frederick installed Otto on the ducal throne.
There is a limestone carved figure, male and crowned, either Frederick Barbarossa or his grandson Frederick II, at the Castello di Lagopesole (Italy). This was made between 1242 and 1250.
Emperor Frederick Barbarossa receiving the entreaties of his son for peace, around 1409–1415, was a drawing that reflects the composition of scenes commissioned by the Council oF Ten to Pisanello for the Great Council Hall of the Doge's Palace in Venice.Humiliation of Frederick I Barbarossa by Pope Alexander III was a painting commissioned by the Venetian government, originally painted by Giovanni Bellini. In 1516, after Bellini's death, the commission was transferred to Titian. This one was destroyed by fire in the 1570s. Giorgione might have been a part of the project.
Tintoretto painted the scene of Barbarossa being crowned by Pope Adrian IV, according to Giorgio Vasari.
Around 1552–1568, Italian artist Cristofano dell'Altissimo painted a portrait of Frederick Barbarossa.
In 1589, Jan van der Straet, called Stradanus created the engraving The deer hunt of Frederick I Barbarossa and Ubaldino Ubaldini.In 1596, Haarlem commissioned a tapestry depicting Emperor Barbarossa and the Patriarch of Jerusalem bestowing Haarlem with an Augmentation of its Arms. The designer was the Haarlem painter Pieter de Grebber. The tapestry corresponds to a painting of the same subject, also painted by De Grebber made for the Haarlem townhall. Both the tapestry and the painting show the presents bestowed by Emperor Barbarossa and the patriarch of Jerusalem (a silver sword and the Holy Cross) on the city.Sant'Ubaldo e Federico Barbarossa (Saint Ubald of Gubbio and Frederick Barbarossa) is a 1683 painting by Ciro Ferri.
Frederick's famous portrait in the Kaisersaal in Frankfurt am Main is part of a series depicting emperors who reigned from 768 to 1806 (created from 1839 to 1853). This portrait is painted by Karl Friedrich Lessing (1808–1880) in 1840. On the ceiling of the Kaisersaal, there is a fresco depicting Beatrice of Burgundy being brought by Apollo as a bride to Frederick, painted by Giovanni Battista Tiepolo (1696–1770) in 1751. Another fresco on the ceiling by the same artist is Hochzeit des Kaisers Friedrich I. Barbarossa und Beatrice von Burgund depicting the marriage of Frederick and Beatrice.

Other than the Kyffhäuser Monument mentioned above, during the early years of the Second Reich, an iconographical program which associated Frederick with Wilhelm I was carried out in Goslar, centred on the old Kaiserpfalz (Imperial Palace). A famous equestrian statue of Frederick Barbarossa, built by Robert Toberentz (1849–1895) in 1893–1895 and erected until 1900, stands in Goslar, with Wilhelm's statue standing nearby (Frederick on the North, Wilhelm on the South). The Kaiserpfalz was decorated with paintings depicting the life of Frederick too, presided over by Johannes Wislicenus, who combined history wỉth fairytale (the German nation as the Sleeping Beauty, or Dornröschen) and saga (the Barbarossa legend), the medieval with the modern. In The proclamation of the Reich, Frederick looked down with approval at the proclamation while Queen Luise was presented as Germania. Other paintings in this program include: Barbarossas Erwachen (Barbarossa awakened), Barbarossas Fußfall vor Heinrich dem Löwen (Barbarossa falling on his knees in front of Henry the Lion, which describes Frederick begging Henry at Chiavenna for military aid against the Lombards in 1176.), Barbarossas Sieg bei Ikonium (Barbarosa's victory in Iconium), Heinrich der Löwe bittet Barbarossa um Verzeihung (Henry the Lion begged Barbarossa for forgiveness, which describes the event in Erfurt in 1181).L'Imperatore Federico Barbarossa, durante il lungo assedio di Alessandria, avendo tentato d'impadronirsi per sorpresa della città, ne viene cacciato dal popolo (1174). Federico Barbarossa cacciato da Alessandria (Frederick Barbarossa expelled from Alexandria) is a 1851 painting by Carlo Arienti.Friedrich Barbarossa 1157 zu Besançon, den Streit der Parteien schlichtend (depicting the emperor trying to separate two conflicting parties – here Otto von Wittelsbach, 1120–1183, wants to physically attack the papal legates) is a painting (1859), by Hermann Freihold Plüddemann (1809–1868).
Julius Schnorr von Carolsfeld (1794–1872) created several depictions of the emperor, among them the engraving Friedrich Barbarossas Tod (Death of Barbarossa); the painting The Sleep of Emperor Frederick Barbarossa; Einzug Friedrich Barbarossas in Mailand (Frederick Barbarossa entering Milan) (1839/40, encaustic, carton, 585x631 cm, now destroyed). 

There was a hall name Barbarossasaal in the Royal Palace of Bavaria at Munich, with paintings commissioned by King Ludwig I of Bavaria and depicting Barbarossa's life (painted by Johann Georg Hiltensperger, Ludwig Michael Schwanthaler, Joseph Karl Stieler and Schnorr): his election as emperor, the entry into Milan, the banishment of Henry the Lion, the installation of Otto of Wittelsbach, his reconciliation with Pope Alexander III, imperial festival at Mayence, the Battle of Iconium, his death. Reliefs were done by Schwanthaler. There is also a Barbarossa Hall at the Castle of Lenzburg, once the emperor's residence.
Peter Janssen's Herzog Heinrich der Löwe vor Barbarossa depicting Henry kneeling in front of Frederick.
Around 1862, Filippo Carcano painted the Federico Barbarossa e il duca Enrico il Leone a Chiavenna. Federico Barbarossa e il duca Enrico il Leone a Chiavenna (Frederick Barbarossa and Duke Henry the Lion in Chiavenna).

In 1892, in 1892, Konstanz's sculptor Hans Baur (1829-1897), won the competition to build a fountain to replace the then dilapidated fountain in the Marktstätte. Baur built a red sandstone four-sided stele or obelisk at the centre of a granite basin of the fountain, now called Kaiserbrunnen (Imperial Fountain). Four great German emperors, representing four great ruling dynasties were chosen: Heinrich III (Franks), Friedrich Barbarossa (Hohenstaufen), Maximilian I (Habsburg) und Wilhelm I (Hohenzollern). The choices and manners of depicting the emperors were considered traditional. When the new fountain was unveiled on 30 October 1897, Bauer had died six months before. Later, the portraits were melted down during wartime. In 1993, new imperial portraits were made by Gernot and Barbara Rumpf. Maximilian (now together with his unloved empress Bianca Maria Sforza), and Frederick Barbarossa returned, depicted in a caricatural manner, while Otto I was introduced (depicted seriously). Barbarossa's figure is fused with that of a large fish, seemingly symbolizing his water-related death. Emperor Wilhelm I was replaced with a pigeon, perhaps symbolizing peace.

Frederick's statue at the city hall in Nijmegen is part of a group depicting Trajan, Charlemagne, the anti-king William of Holland, Henry VII of Luxembourgh, Emperor Charles IV and Charles V.Madonna di Provenzano con Federico Barbarossa e Alessandro III is a 1959 palio painting by Vasco Valacchi describing Frederick kneeling in front of Pope Alexander III beside the figure of Madonna of Provenzano.Madonna di Provenzano con Federico Barbarossa e Alessandro III is a 1981 palio painting by Mario Ghezzi on the same subject.

On the occasion of the 800th anniversary of the Mainz Imperial Festival and the Diet of Pentecost 1184, Erwin Mosen's team created a Barbarossa monument (2m in height; the emperor is shown flanked by his two sons in Mainz.

Novels

He is a character in the fictional work La Religieuse by Marie-Catherine de Villedieu (1640–1683). In the story, he acted as a benefactor of a convent to court a beautiful nun who lived there.Friedrich's des Ersten letzte Lebenstage is a 1858 novel by Julius Bacher about the last days of the emperor.Federico Barbarossa all'assedio di Crema romanzo storico is a 1873 novel by the Italian writer and playwright Pietro Saraceni.
Karl Hans Strobl wrote the novel Kaiser Rotbart in 1935, using the life of the emperor to provide a framework to desbribe the early German Middle Age.Barbarossa is a novel about the emperor by Conrad von Bolanden.Kaiser Friedrich Barbarossa: Historischer Roman is a 1954 novel about Frederick by Heinrich Bauer (1896–1975).
Frederick is an important character in Wie ein Falke im Sturm. In this novel, he was served by the young nobleman Ditho who tracked down an assassin who tried to kill him.Baudolino is a 2011 novel by Umberto Eco. The story is about the young farmer Baudolino, Frederick (Federico Barbarossa)'s godson.
Sabine Ebert (born 1958) writes a five-book saga on Frederick, which includes:
 Schwert und Krone – Meister der Täuschung. Droemer Knaur, München 2017, ISBN 978-3-426-65412-5.
 Schwert und Krone – Der junge Falke. Droemer Knaur, München 2017, ISBN 978-3-426-65413-2.
 Schwert und Krone – Zeit des Verrats. Droemer Knaur, München 2018, ISBN 978-3-426-65445-3.
 Schwert und Krone – Herz aus Stein. Droemer Knaur, München 2019, ISBN 978-3-426-22662-9
 Schwert und Krone – Preis der Macht. Droemer Knaur, München 2020, ISBN 978-3-426-22710-7Adler und Löwe: Friedrich Barbarossa und Heinrich der Löwe im Kampf um die Macht is a 2021 novel about Frederick and Henry the Lion by Paul Barz.Le fils chartreux de Barberousse is a 2015 novel by Annie Maas about Terric, the natural son of Barbarossa.Barbarossa - Im Schatten des Kaisers: Historischer Roman is a 2022 novel about Arndt von Cappenberg, who served Frederick but loved Beatrice, by Michael Peinkofer.

Films
Frederick is portrayed by Amleto Novelli in the 1910 Italian film Federico Barbarossa, also named La Bataille de Legnano, directed by Mario Caserini. The film ends with Frederick being fatally wounded in battle by Alberto da Giussano.
In Vision (2009 film), a movie directed by Margarethe von Trotta, he is played by Devid Striesow.

Barbarossa cities
There are several cities associating themselves with the memory of the emperor (called Barbarossasttadt, or Barbarossa city). The cities usually mentioned include Sinzig, Kaiserslautern, Gelnhausen, Altenburg, Bad Frankenhausen, but Annweiler am Trifels, Bad Wimpfen, Eberbach and Waiblingen consider themselves as such as well.

Events

There are various medieval festivals associated with Frederick and the Hohenstaufen dynasty in Germany, with some of the notable ones including:
The , a great biennial medieval festival organized at the Marienberg Fortress in Würzburg.
The Barbarossa Festspiel in Altenburg.
The Stauferspektakel in Göppingen.
The Staufer-Spektakel in Waiblingen.

Since 1981, Como organized the Palio del Baradello, in which various villages competed to win the Pallium, a silk drape that is hand-painted by various artists from Como every year.

2022 is the 900th commemoration year of the birth of Frederick Barbarossa. Recently in Selm, a stele has been created to commemorate the emperor. Events like exhibitions and festivals about Frederick have been planned in various German localities, including a celebration at the Barbarossa Cave.

Recently, to commemorate the emperor, the Supply Battalion 131 (called "Battalion Barbarossa") of the Kyffhäuser barracks (Kyffhäuser-Kaserne, Bundeswehr built a huge ground artwork in Bad Frankenhausen,  which uses among other things 300 roles of fabric (each was 100 meters long). The mission is named Rotbart'' ("Redbeard").

See also 

Cultural depictions of Frederick II, Holy Roman Emperor
Cultural depictions of Otto I, Holy Roman Emperor
Cultural depictions of Otto III, Holy Roman Emperor
Cultural depictions of Conrad II, Holy Roman Emperor
Cultural depictions of Charles IV, Holy Roman Emperor
Cultural depictions of Sigismund, Holy Roman Emperor
Cultural depictions of Maximilian I, Holy Roman Emperor
Cultural depictions of Charles V, Holy Roman Emperor
Imperial Palace of Goslar
Wilhelm I, German Emperor
Barbarossa Palace, Gelnhausen
Barbarossa city
Barbarossa Cave
Kyffhäuser Monument
Lenzburg Castle
Kaiserbrunnen in Konstanz (German Wiki)

References

Bibliography and further reading

 
 
 
 
 
 
 
 
 
 
 
 
 
 
 
 
 
 
 
 
 
 
 
 
 
 

 

Frederick I, Holy Roman Emperor
Cultural depictions of Holy Roman Emperors